Cracking Up may refer to:

 Cracking Up (TV series), a 2004 American television sitcom
 Cracking Up (1983 film), a 1983 film directed by and starring Jerry Lewis
 Cracking Up (1994 film), a 1994 film directed by and starring Matt Mitler
 Cracking Up (song), a song by The Jesus and Mary Chain